Choreutis mesolyma is a moth in the family Choreutidae. It was described by Alexey Diakonoff in 1978. It is found in Szechuen, China.

References

Natural History Museum Lepidoptera generic names catalog

Choreutis
Moths described in 1978